Dublin City may refer to:
Dublin, the capital of the Republic of Ireland
Dublin City Council
Dublin City F.C., association football club in Northside, Dublin
Dublin City (Parliament of Ireland constituency), a constituency before 1801
Dublin City (UK Parliament constituency), a constituency between 1801 and 1885

See also
Dublin (disambiguation)